Kafue is a constituency of the National Assembly of Zambia. It covers a rural area to the south of Lusaka, including the towns of Kafue and Chiawa.

List of MPs

References

Constituencies of the National Assembly of Zambia
1973 establishments in Zambia
Constituencies established in 1973